Eunoe alvinella is a scale worm described from a specimen collected at a depth of 2725 m on the East Pacific Rise.

Description
Number of segments 34; elytra 15 pairs. No distinct pigmentation pattern. Anterior margin of prostomium rounded. Lateral antennae inserted ventrally (beneath prostomium and median antenna). Notochaetae distinctly thicker than neurochaetae. Bidentate neurochaetae absent.

References

Phyllodocida
Animals described in 1989